Sanna Sepponen (born January 1978) is a Finnish actress. She played the character Roosa Kemppainen in the soap opera Salatut elämät from 2001 to 2004. She was also on the reality show Toisenlaiset frendit from 2010 to 2014.

Sepponen has Down syndrome. She has competed in Special Olympics alpine skiing.

References

External links
 

Living people
Finnish actresses
Actors with Down syndrome
1978 births
Finnish disabled sportspeople